Initiative to the People 276 (or the Public Disclosure Act) was a law approved by the people of Washington in a vote (plebiscite) held in 1972. The law required the state government to establish the Washington State Public Disclosure Commission in order to provide information to the public about campaign fundraising and expenditures  The initiative was passed by the people at the same time as the November 1972 general election, by a margin of 72.02% to 27.98%.

The law has since been superseded by the Washington Public Records Act. The current law on the subject is codified in the Revised Code (RCW), Title 42, Chapter 56.

Full title
The official long title of the Public Disclosure Act was

References

1972 Washington (state) ballot measures
Initiatives in the United States